= Pike Signals =

Traffic control equipment manufacturers

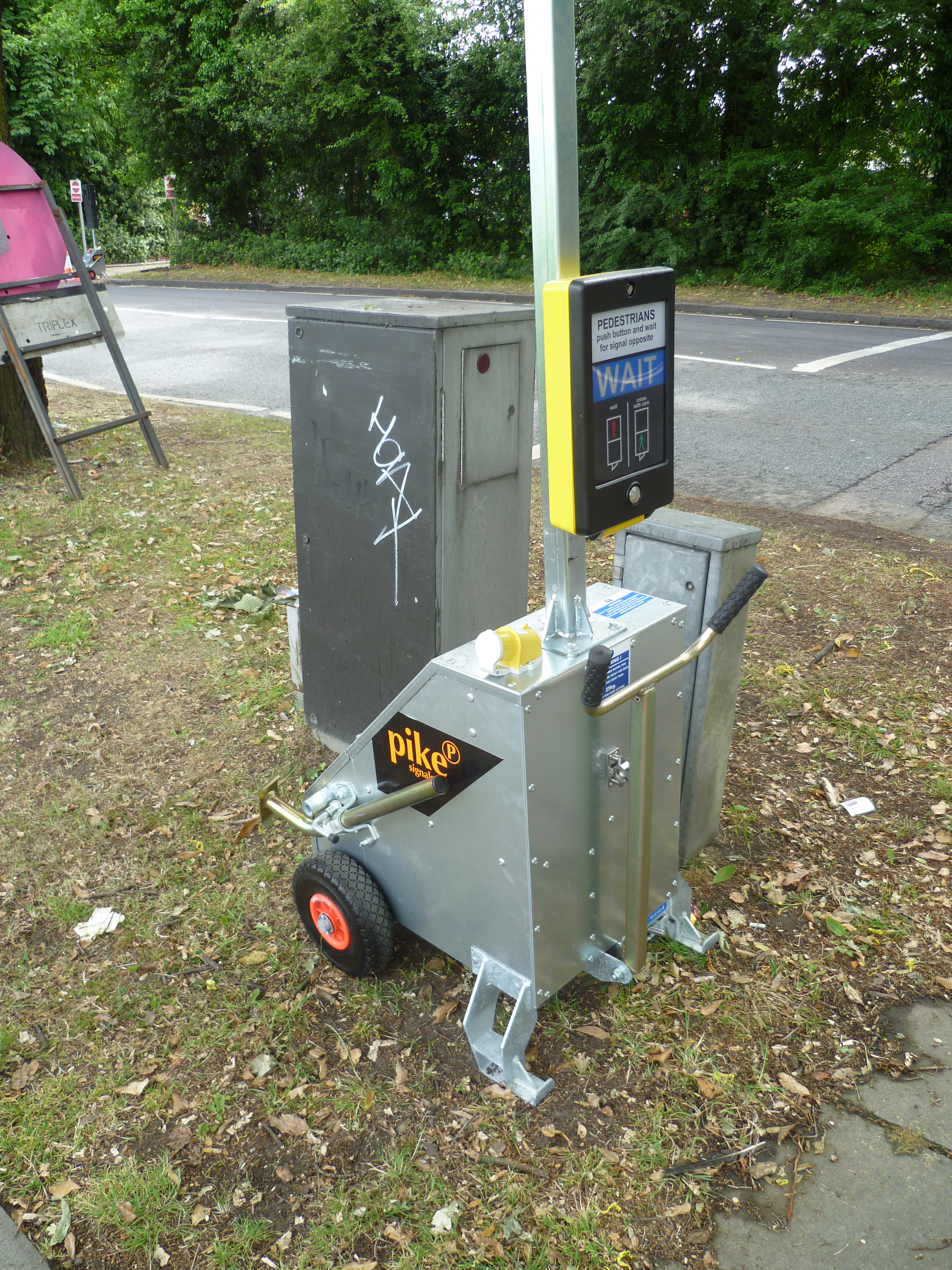
Pike Signals XLMicro battery powered wireless equipment in use in London.

Pike Signals Limited are manufacturers of portable traffic control equipment.

== History ==
The business was started by George Pike in Birmingham in 1920 and originally sold road construction tools. In 1932, George Pike's son started to make portable traffic signals. In 1981, Andrew Pike, current managing director and grandson of George, founded Pike Signals which was incorporated on 18 September 1981.

== Products ==
In 1999, the firm launched the U.K.'s first radio controlled temporary traffic light system. Previous methods of controlling temporary lights had used interconnecting cables which were vulnerable to vandalism and wear and tear from passing vehicles.
